Big Sandy Creek, often called the Big Branch, is a tributary of the Illinois River in central Illinois.  It drains a large portion of southwestern Morgan County and southern Scott County.  The drainage of Big Sandy Creek includes Lake Jacksonville and the county seat of Scott County, Winchester, Illinois.

Most of the Big Sandy Creek drainage is intensely farmed arable land.  Because the land is sandy, nitrogen runoff due to fertilizer application is significant.  In addition, Jacksonville and Winchester drain their sewage into the creek.

Little Sandy Creek is a tributary of Big Sandy Creek.  The two streams combine shortly before discharging into the Illinois River opposite the hamlet of Montezuma, Illinois.  Sand discharged by the alluvial creeks may have helped form McEvers Island, a silt island in the Illinois River just below the mouth of the creek.

References

Rivers of Morgan County, Illinois
Rivers of Scott County, Illinois
Rivers of Illinois